Huadong Subdistrict is a subdistrict in Xihe District, Fuxin, Liaoning, China. In 2018, it had five residential communities under its administration.

See also 
 List of township-level divisions of Liaoning

References 

Township-level divisions of Liaoning
Fuxin